Richard Gethin may refer to:
Sir Richard Gethin, 1st Baronet (c. 1615-c. 1685), of the Gethin baronets, Privy Counsellor of Ireland
Sir Richard Gethin, 2nd Baronet (1674–1709), of the Gethin baronets
Sir Richard Gethin, 3rd Baronet (1698-c. 1765), of the Gethin baronets, High Sheriff of Sligo
Sir Richard Gethin, 4th Baronet (c. 1725-c. 1778), of the Gethin baronets
Sir Richard Gethin, 6th Baronet (1823–1885), of the Gethin baronets
Sir Richard Charles Percy Gethin, 7th Baronet (1847–1921), of the Gethin baronets
Sir Richard Walter St Lawrence Gethin, 8th Baronet (1878–1946), of the Gethin baronets
Sir Richard Patrick St Lawrence Gethin, 9th Baronet (1911–1988), of the Gethin baronets
Major Sir Richard Gethin, Sir Richard Joseph St Lawrence Gethin, 10th Baronet (born 1949), of the Gethin baronets

See also
Gethin